Luigi Valenti Gonzaga  (15 October 1725 – 29 December 1808) was a cardinal of the Catholic Church. He was elected to the Roman Curia and the Papal diplomacy, and was also nuntius of Switzerland and Spain.

Valenti Gonzaga was born at Roveredo, in what is now the province of Mantua. He was made cardinal in pectore in April 1776 by Pope Pius VI, published in May 1776. He was made Cardinal-Priest of Sant'Agnese fuori le mura in 1778.

He took part in the 1799–1800 Conclave as chosen by Pope Pius VII.

He was State Secretary in 1740 and was later prefect for the Congregation for the Evangelization of Peoples from 1747.

He was the nephew of Cardinal Silvio Valenti Gonzaga (created 1738) and also related to Cesare Guerrieri Gonzaga (created 1738). He died at Viterbo. He commissioned the architect Camillo Morigia to design a monument to cover the tomb of Dante Alighieri in Ravenna, completed in 1781.

References

1725 births
1808 deaths
Clergy from the Province of Mantua
19th-century Italian cardinals
18th-century Italian cardinals
Cardinals created by Pope Pius VI